Stanley Charles Scarsbrook (born October 1908, date of death unknown) was an English track and field athlete who competed in the 1934 British Empire Games.

At the 1934 Empire Games he won the gold medal in the 2 miles steeplechase event. The same year he won his only British Athletics title, in the same event.

References

External links
commonwealthgames.com results

1908 births
Year of death missing
British male steeplechase runners
English male steeplechase runners
Commonwealth Games gold medallists for England
Commonwealth Games medallists in athletics
Athletes (track and field) at the 1934 British Empire Games
Medallists at the 1934 British Empire Games